
Alfred Kuzmany (born 24 October 1893 in Dorna-Watra, Bukovina, Austria-Hungary–4 October 1961) was a general in the Wehrmacht of Nazi Germany during World War II. He was a recipient of the Knight's Cross of the Iron Cross.

Awards and decorations 

 Knight's Cross of the Iron Cross on 2 February 1942 as Oberstleutnant and commander of Infanterie-Regiment 338

References

Citations

Bibliography

 

1893 births
1961 deaths
People from Vatra Dornei
Major generals of the German Army (Wehrmacht)
Austro-Hungarian military personnel of World War I
Austrian military personnel of World War II
Recipients of the Knight's Cross of the Iron Cross
German prisoners of war in World War II held by the United States
Bukovina-German people